The Staphylococcaceae are a family of Gram-positive bacteria that includes the genus Staphylococcus, noted for encompassing several medically significant pathogens.

The five genera Jeotgalicoccus, Macrococcus, Nosocomiicoccus, Salinicoccus, and  Staphylococcus have been shown to be monophyletic, while Gemella appears to be polyphyletic.  The pathogen methicillin-resistant Staphylococcus aureus is a member of this family.

References

 
Bacillales
Bacteria families